Guide Plus+ (in Europe), TV Guide On Screen, TV Guide Daily, TV Guide Plus+ and Guide Plus+ Gold (in North America) or G-Guide (in Japan) are brand names for an interactive electronic program guide (EPG) system that is used in consumer electronics products, such as television sets, DVD recorders, personal video recorders, and other digital television devices. It offers interactive on-screen program listings that enable viewers to navigate, sort, select and schedule television programming for viewing and recording. The differing names are only used for marketing purposes – the entire system is owned by Rovi Corporation, the successor to Gemstar-TV Guide International.  In 2016, Rovi acquired digital video recorder maker TiVo Inc., and renamed itself TiVo Corporation.

In late 2012, Rovi issued a notice to its North American users through the Guide Plus+, TV Guide On Screen and 'Rovi Guide' message system that broadcast transmission of the service would cease beginning in November 2012, and be discontinued gradually by April 2013.

The service was discontinued in Europe by the end of 2016.

Technical overview
The system was launched in the United States and Japan in the mid-1990s, and began to be deployed throughout Europe during the 2000s. It was also available for broadcast and cable services in Canada, France, Germany, Spain, the United Kingdom, Austria, Switzerland, the Netherlands, Belgium and Italy.

Companies that manufacture products that are compatible with the system include those made by Channel Master, Hitachi, JVC, Matsushita/Panasonic, Thomson (RCA, GE and ProScan), Samsung, Sharp, Sony, LG Group and Toshiba. Since the service is advertiser-supported, the updated program listings are provided to users free of charge, regardless of whether they receive their television signal over the air or via cable or satellite television. Gemstar also produced EPG computer software bundled with analog NTSC TV tuner cards made by ATI Technologies, particularly the TV Wonder and All-in-Wonder lines. ATI later partnered with TitanTV to provide its digital ATSC cards.

The original analog service uses the vertical blanking interval (VBI) of host television stations that datacast the service, similar to the manner that closed captioning and teletext are broadcast. This can take 24 hours to download on the initial setup, because the information is delivered at a low bitrate.

Digital television
The digital service was launched in the United States in 2006, using the ATSC digital television standard. Although the implementation of the digital transmissions improved the service significantly, older systems were no longer able to download listings following the June 12, 2009, digital television transition.

The Program and System Information Protocol (PSIP) utilized by the ATSC standard allows for each television station to send out its own program listings information; in the United States, the Federal Communications Commission (FCC) requires broadcast stations to provide programming information over PSIP, but not cable providers, unless they rebroadcast a broadcast television station that provides PSIP data. However, actual implementation is rather scattered, and usually minimal; often cases, stations do not provide full programming descriptions or even display the correct information about the program currently airing, much less programming information for the next three hours that is required of them, or the guide information over a 16-day period that can be transmitted. Additionally, ATSC tuners are not required to show the EPG, only the very limited information for the current show on the channel being viewed.

While the TV Guide service also requires software installed in a television set or other device, and licensing fees or royalties must be paid to Rovi, it also offers a more complete solution for broadcast television, more like digital satellite or digital cable.

See also
NexTView
VCR+

References

External links
Guide Plus
TV Guide On Screen
Configuring Guide Plus+ for the French part of Switzerland

Digital television
TV Guide
Products and services discontinued in 2013
Products and services discontinued in 2016